Saskatoon was an experiment to measure the anisotropy (directional dependence) of the cosmic microwave background at angular scales of 60 < l < 360.  It was named for Saskatoon, Saskatchewan, Canada, where the experiment took place, and occurred in the winters of 1993 to 1995.

See also
Cosmic microwave background experiments
Observational cosmology

References

Cosmic microwave background experiments